Yılmaz Vural (born 1 January 1953) is a Turkish football manager and former player. He played as a midfielder for Hacettepe and Sivasspor in the 1970s.

Career
He is most known for his aggressive coaching style. Vural managed most of the clubs in the Turkish League, apart from the three giants which are Beşiktaş, Fenerbahçe, and Galatasaray.
On 11 March 2008, he was sacked after his unsuccessful performance at Vestel Manisaspor with collecting just 7 points in 5 league matches. Recently, his name was given to a street in Adapazarı, where he was born and grown, in accordance with a local municipality project. On 10 October 2012, he was appointed to be the manager of Elazığspor. On 19 May 2013, he resigned from Elazığspor. On December 30, 2015 Vural was famously sacked from Gençlerbirliği by owner İlhan Cavcav after six days and only one game - a 2-0 away loss to Eskisehirspor.

Popular culture
Yilmaz is well known with his characteristic behaviors. After his iconic post-interviews, he became popular in Turkish media. He plays as an actor at the ads of Lipton in Turkey.

Managerial statistics

References

External links
Profile at TFF.org

1953 births
Living people
Sportspeople from Adapazarı
Turkish footballers
Sivasspor footballers
Association football midfielders
Turkish football managers
Süper Lig managers
Malatyaspor managers
Bursaspor managers
Gaziantepspor managers
Eskişehirspor managers
Trabzonspor managers
Gençlerbirliği S.K. managers
Konyaspor managers
Çanakkale Dardanelspor managers
Denizlispor managers
Diyarbakırspor managers
Adanaspor managers
Çaykur Rizespor managers
MKE Ankaragücü managers
Antalyaspor managers
Manisaspor managers
Kocaelispor managers
Karşıyaka S.K. managers
Samsunspor managers
Kasımpaşa S.K. managers
Elazığspor managers
Sarıyer S.K. managers
Akhisarspor managers